Georg Grün is a German conductor. He studied church and school music, conducting, Catholic theology and musicology at the Musikhochschule Saarbrücken and the University of Saarland, and studied organ improvisation under Jean-Pierre Leguay in Paris. He is the conductor of the chamber choir KammerChor Saarbrücken, which he established in 1990. In 2000 he became a professor at the Music Conservatory in Mannheim and has given master classes internationally. In 2012 he became a professor at the Music Conservatory Saar in Saarbrücken.

References

External links 
 Georg Grün's website

German male conductors (music)
Academic staff of the Hochschule für Musik Saar
Living people
21st-century German conductors (music)
21st-century German male musicians
Year of birth missing (living people)